The 1988 NCAA Division II women's soccer tournament was the first annual NCAA-sponsored tournament to determine the team national champion of Division II women's college soccer in the United States.

The championship of the inaugural event was played at Barry University in Miami Shores, Florida.

Cal State Hayward defeated hosts Barry in the final, 1–0, to claim their first national title.

Qualified teams
 Four programs qualified for the inaugural Division II tournament.

Bracket

See also 
1988 NCAA Division I Women's Soccer Tournament
NCAA Division III Women's Soccer Championship
1988 NCAA Division I Men's Soccer Tournament
NAIA Women's Soccer Championship

References 

NCAA Division II Women's Soccer Championship
NCAA Division II Field Hockey Championship
NCAA Division II Field Hockey Championship
NCAA Division II Field Hockey Championship
Women's sports in Florida